Masahiko Umeda (born 23 December 1947) is a Japanese former wrestler who competed in the 1972 Summer Olympics.

References

1947 births
Living people
Olympic wrestlers of Japan
Wrestlers at the 1972 Summer Olympics
Japanese male sport wrestlers
20th-century Japanese people